Newmindspace is a New York- and Toronto-based urban arts collective founded in 2005 by Lori Kufner and Kevin Bracken. The pair organizes free, monthly events in cities throughout North America. Using a mailing list and their website newmindspace.com to communicate with their community, Newmindspace hosts all-ages events that generally attract teenagers, twentysomethings and people in their early 30s. Their events have inspired other groups to undertake similar projects in cities around the world.

Events

 Subway Parties 
 Urban Capture the Flag
 Public pillow fights
 Bubble battles, where hundreds participants use bubble toys simultaneously
 Massive (2 km+) murals 
 Blacklight-lit cardboard tube fighting Lightsaber battles

Ideology and inspiration

Newmindspace is loosely connected to the Toronto Public Space Committee, and considers reclaiming public space the most important goal of their activities. They also claim they are committed to "inventing new ways of having fun", pointing out that most cities lack free, quality entertainment for young people. Other events, such as their urban easter egg hunts or Night Lights, are intended to be public art installations modeled after the works of Christo and Jeanne-Claude.

Sources

McGinn, Dave. "Don't stop the guerilla party train". Dose magazine, 18 Aug 2005.
Lazarovic, Sarah. "Revelers See Stars at Underground Celebration". The Globe and Mail, 16 Aug 2005.
"Subway parties". CBC's The Hour with George Stroumboulopoulos, 12 Dec 2005.
"Space Invaders". National Post, 4 Nov 2006.
"Reclaim the City, One Party at a Time". National Post, 21 Jan 2006.
"(Pillow) Fight Club". New York Times, 18 Feb 2006.
"Shiny Happy People". University of Toronto Magazine, 1 Sep 2006.
"Newmindspace Puts Stars in the Sky". Now Magazine, 16 Nov 2006.

External links 
 

Culture of New York City
Culture of Toronto